Basir is an Iranian laser-guided, 155 mm high explosive artillery shell designed to destroy enemy tanks, vehicles and other moving or non-moving targets with high precision.

These shells were unveiled on January 30, 2012, on the first day of the so-called "Daheye Fajr", a key point during the Islamic Revolution by defense minister Ahmad Vahidi. He later added that this system is very useful in mountainous areas.

Iranian TV showed some footage of the weapon being fired from an HM 41 howitzer at land and sea targets. It has a reported range of 20 km.

Operators

See also
List of military equipment manufactured in Iran
 HM 41 howitzer

References

External links
Video

155mm artillery shells
Artillery of Iran
Guided artillery shells
Islamic Republic of Iran Army
Military equipment of Iran